The  is one of nine active divisions of the Japan Ground Self-Defense Force. The division is subordinated to the Western Army and is headquartered in Kasuga, Fukuoka. Its responsibility is the defense of the Fukuoka, Nagasaki, Ōita and Saga prefectures.

The division was established on 15 August 1962.

Organization 

 4th Division, in Kasuga
 4th Division HQ, in Kasuga
 Western Army Tank Unit, in Kusu, with two squadrons of Type 10 main battle tanks (administrative control during peacetime)
 16th Infantry Regiment note 1, in Ōmura, with Type 96 Armored Personnel Carriers
 40th Infantry Regiment, in Kitakyūshū
 41st Infantry Regiment, in Beppu
 Tsushima Area Security Force, in Tsushima
 4th Reconnaissance Combat Battalion, in Kasuga, with Type 16 maneuver combat vehicles, and Type 87 armored reconnaissance vehicles
 4th Anti-Aircraft Artillery Battalion, in Kurume, with Type 81 and Type 93 Surface-to-air missile systems
 4th Engineer Battalion (Combat), in Ōmura
 4th Signal Battalion, in Kasuga
 4th Aviation Squadron, in Yoshinogari, flying UH-1J and OH-6D helicopters
 4th NBC Protection Company, in Kasuga
 4th Logistic Support Regiment, in Kasuga
 1st Maintenance Battalion
 2nd Maintenance Battalion
 Supply Company
 Medical Company
 Transport Company

note 1: Infantry Regiments have only battalion strength.

External links
 Homepage 4th Division (Japanese)

Japan Ground Self-Defense Force Division
Military units and formations established in 1962